Erin Mills is a large suburban district in the city of Mississauga, Ontario, Canada, approximately  west of Downtown Toronto. Cadillac Fairview inherited the development from E. P. Taylor's Don Mills Development Corporation, which acquired land in the 1950s and coined the area's name. Taylor sold the development to Cadillac Fairview in 1968. The name paid homage to the historic Erindale to the south as well as various mills along the Credit River to the east. The closest mill was found along Eglinton Avenue in what was once Barberton, now a ghost town that once was built around the Toronto Woollen (Mills) Factory owned by brothers Robert and William Barber.

Erin Mills is an integrated residential, industrial and, commercial community, with commercial uses concentrated in the centre and industrial uses on the periphery.

Based on census boundaries, the 2001 population was estimated at 105,000, making it the most populous but not the most densely-populated area in Mississauga, and one of the fastest-growing. As of the Canada 2016 Census, the population is 122,560.

Erin Mills Parkway mostly follows the course of the former Fifth Line West.

References

neighbourhoods in Mississauga